Thanjavur Marathi may refer to:
 Thanjavur Marathi (people), an ethno-linguistic group in Tamil Nadu which originated mainly during the rule of the Thanjavur Maratha kingdom
 Thanjavur Marathi (language), a dialect of the Marathi language spoken by the Thanjavur Marathi people

Language and nationality disambiguation pages